Shanti-Sthala is the samadhi of the 13th head of Ramsnehi Sampradaya, Swami Ji Shri Ramkishorji Maharaj. It is located in Ramniwas Dham, Shahpura, Bhilwara. On entering Ram Niwas Dham, it is situated around 50 metres to the left of Ram Charan Dwar. It is made of yellow limestone sourced from Jaisalmer. It is surrounded by a green courtyard.

The Indira Gandhi National Centre for the Arts mentions the Shanti Sthala:

See also 
 Ram Charan Maharaj
 Shahpura, Bhilwara
 Ram Kishor Ji Maharaj
 Ramdwara
 Sri Ram Snehi Bhaskar Magazine

References

 Images by IGNCA http://ignca.nic.in/asp/all.asp?projectid=rjblw2760001

Monuments and memorials in Rajasthan
Tourist attractions in Bhilwara district